The  New York Giants season was the franchise's 26th season in the National Football League.

Schedule

Playoffs

Standings

See also 
 List of New York Giants seasons

References 

New York Giants seasons
New York Giants
New York Giants
1950s in Manhattan
Washington Heights, Manhattan